The 2005 Race of Champions took place on December 3 again at the Stade de France in Saint-Denis.

The individual event was won by Sébastien Loeb after Tom Kristensen crashed out of the final, and the Nations Cup event by Tom Kristensen and Mattias Ekström representing Scandinavia.

Changes from the past included a number of wild card drivers, the use of the Porsche 911 GT3 instead of the Ferrari 360 Modena and the introduction of the Renault Mégane Trophy alongside the Citroën Xsara WRC and now traditional "ROC Buggy" as competition cars.

Participants

Race of Champions

Racing Group
Eight drivers were randomly selected to compete in a first eliminatory round.

Rallying Group

Final

The Nations Cup

Preliminary round

Quarterfinals

Semifinals

Final

See also
Race of Champions

References

External links

Race of Champions
Race of Champions
Race of Champions
International sports competitions hosted by France